Franco Bounous was an Italian diplomat.

Bounous was the 3rd Italian Ambassador to Cyprus. Later, he became the 10th Italian Ambassador to Pakistan.

On 18 April 1945, he married Italian writer Alba de Céspedes y Bertini.

See also 
 Ministry of Foreign Affairs (Italy)
 Foreign relations of Italy

References

Ambassadors of Italy to Pakistan
Italian diplomats
Year of birth missing
Year of death missing